Hypsotropa is a genus of snout moths. It was described by Philipp Christoph Zeller in 1848. The type species is Hypsotropa limbella.

Species
 Hypsotropa adumbratella Ragonot, 1888
 Hypsotropa atakorella (Marion, 1957)
 Hypsotropa chionorhabda Hampson, 1918
 Hypsotropa contrastella (Ragonot, 1888)
 Hypsotropa diaphaea Hampson, 1918
 Hypsotropa endorhoda Hampson, 1918
 Hypsotropa fusifasciata Hampson, 1918
 Hypsotropa graptophlebia Hampson, 1918
 Hypsotropa heterocerella (Hampson, 1896)
 Hypsotropa ichorella Lederer, 1855
 Hypsotropa infumatella Ragonot, 1901
 Hypsotropa leucocraspis Hampson, 1918
 Hypsotropa limbella Zeller, 1848
 Hypsotropa makulanella de Joannis, 1927
 Hypsotropa monostidza Hampson, 1918
 Hypsotropa niveicosta Hampson, 1918
 Hypsotropa ochricostella Hampson, 1918
 Hypsotropa ocraceella Hampson, 1918
 Hypsotropa periphaea Hampson, 1918
 Hypsotropa pervittella Hampson, 1918
 Hypsotropa polystictella Hampson, 1918
 Hypsotropa punctinervella Hampson, 1918
 Hypsotropa purpurella Hampson, 1918
 Hypsotropa pusillella Ragonot, 1888
 Hypsotropa rhodochroella Hampson, 1918
 Hypsotropa roseotincta Janse, 1922
 Hypsotropa rosescens Hampson, 1918
 Hypsotropa sabuletella (Zeller, 1852)
 Hypsotropa subcostella Hampson, 1918
 Hypsotropa unipunctella Ragonot, 1888
 Hypsotropa vulneratella Zeller, 1847

References

Anerastiini
Pyralidae genera